The Spectre of the Bride (Spanish:El espectro de la novia) is a 1943 Mexican mystery film directed by René Cardona and starring David T. Bamberg, Narciso Busquets and Mimí Derba.

Cast
 Julio Ahuet 
 David T. Bamberg as Fu Manchu 
 Narciso Busquets as Juanito 
 Mimí Derba 
 Cuquita Escobar 
 Josefina Escobedo 
 Miguel Ángel Ferriz 
 Manuel Medel as Satanás  
 José Pidal 
 Ángel T. Sala
 Agustín Sen 
 Hernán Vera

References

Bibliography 
 Cotter, Bob. The Mexican Masked Wrestler and Monster Filmography. McFarland & Company, 2005.

External links 
 

1943 films
1943 mystery films
Mexican mystery films
1960s Spanish-language films
Films directed by René Cardona
Mexican black-and-white films
1940s Mexican films
1960s Mexican films